A Handful of Dust is a 1988 British film directed by Charles Sturridge, based on the 1934 novel of the same name by Evelyn Waugh. It stars James Wilby and Kristin Scott Thomas.

It was nominated at the 61st Academy Awards for Best Costume (Jane Robinson), losing to Dangerous Liaisons. Judi Dench won the BAFTA Award for Best Supporting Actress.

Plot
The marriage of English country gentleman, Tony Last and his wife Brenda, is falling apart. Brenda begins an affair with social climber John Beaver. When the Lasts' eight-year-old son, John Andrew, is killed in a riding accident, Brenda informs Tony of her affair. She 
requests a divorce so she can marry Beaver. Tony is shattered, but initially agrees and intends to provide her with £500 a year. Beaver and his mother have pressed Brenda to demand £2,000 per year. This amount would require Tony to give up Hetton Abbey, his beloved Victorian Gothic house and estate. After determining that Brenda is aware that he would have to give up the estate and knowing, as she does, how much he loves his home, he withdraws from the divorce negotiations. He announces that he intends to travel for six months. On his return, he says, Brenda may have her divorce but without any financial support.

Without the settlement, Beaver loses interest in Brenda. She is reduced to poverty and Beaver leaves with his mother for California. Tony joins an explorer on an expedition in search of a supposed lost city in the Brazilian forest. The expedition fails and Tony is the last survivor. He is rescued by Mr. Todd, a settler who rules over a small community in an inaccessible part of the jungle. The illiterate Mr. Todd has a collection of the novels of Charles Dickens, which Tony reads to him. When Mr. Todd continues to demur in helping Tony return to civilization, Tony realises he is being held against his will. A search party finally reaches the settlement, but Todd has arranged for Tony to be drugged and hidden; he tells the party that Tony has died and gives them his watch to take home. When Tony awakes he learns that his hopes of rescue have  gone and that he is condemned to read Dickens to his captor indefinitely. Back in England, Tony's death is accepted; Hetton passes to his cousins who erect a memorial to his memory, while Brenda resolves her situation by marrying Tony's friend Jock Grant-Menzies.

Cast
 James Wilby as Tony Last
 Kristin Scott Thomas as Brenda Last
 Rupert Graves as John Beaver
 Anjelica Huston as Mrs. Rattery
 Judi Dench as Mrs. Beaver
 Alec Guinness as Mr. Todd
 Pip Torrens as Jock
 Beatie Edney as Marjorie
 Stephen Fry as Reggie, Brenda's brother

Reception

Critical response
Roger Ebert of the Chicago Sun-Times gave the film three out of four stars and observed, "This is a peculiar movie, but a provocative one. The performances imply more than the dialogue explains, and there are passages where we cannot quite believe how monstrously the characters are behaving... "A Handful of Dust" has more cruelty in it than a dozen violent Hollywood thrillers, and it is all expressed so quietly, almost politely."

Vincent Canby of The New York Times praised Anjelica Huston's portrayal of Mrs Rattery as the "single most stunning performance" but called the film "both too literal and devoid of real point."

Box Office
The film made £608,594 in the UK.

References

External links
 
 

1988 films
1980s historical drama films
British historical drama films
Films based on works by Evelyn Waugh
Films directed by Charles Sturridge
Films scored by George Fenton
Films set in country houses
Films set in Brazil
New Line Cinema films
1988 drama films
1980s English-language films
1980s British films